Ingobernable is a Mexican political drama streaming television series starring Kate del Castillo that premiered on Netflix on 24 March 2017. Del Castillo plays the fictional First Lady of Mexico, Emilia Urquiza, and Erik Hayser plays the fictional President of Mexico, Diego Nava. The presidential couple push for internal peace in their country, but this is made difficult as unforeseen challenges emerge, and a major scandal begins to develop. Alicia Jaziz, Alessio Valentini Padilla, Erendira Ibarra, and Álvaro Guerrero round out the cast playing the couple's daughter and son, the president's chief of staff, and the Secretary of the Interior, respectively. Netflix renewed the series for a second season, which became available on its streaming service on 14 September 2018.

Plot 
The plot revolves around the murder of Mexico's president, Diego Nava Martinez (Erik Hayser). On the night of his death, he attacks his wife, Emilia Urquiza (Kate del Castillo), in an abusive rage. The two struggle, and Emilia is eventually knocked unconscious. She wakes up to find that Diego is dead, his bloody body cast off the balcony of their hotel room. A gun she aimed at him in the midst of their encounter is in her hand, even though she had left it in the bedroom. This leads her to believe that someone else came into the room to kill Diego, then set her up to take the fall. So, she flees from the police.

Emilia Urquiza is the first lady of Mexico and has great plans to improve the conditions of the country thanks to her commitment to fight for peace. As Emilia begins to lose faith in her husband, President Diego Nava, she is at a crossroads and will have to find a way to deal with a big challenge and discover the truth.

Cast

Main
 Kate del Castillo as Emilia Urquiza: First Lady of Mexico
 Erendira Ibarra as Ana Vargas-West: Chief of Staff of the President's Office
 Alberto Guerra as Canek Lagos
 Erik Hayser as Diego Nava Martínez: President of Mexico
 Luis Roberto Guzmán as Pete Vázquez: CIA agent
 Álvaro Guerrero as José Barquet: Secretary of the Interior
 Luis Ernesto Franco as Santiago Salazar

Recurring
 Fernando Luján as Tomás Urquiza
 Aida López as Chela Lagos
 Alicia Jaziz as María Nava Urquiza
 Alessio Valentini Padilla as Emiliano Nava Urquiza
 Marco Treviño as Agustín Aguirre, Secretary of National Defense
 María del Carmen Farías as Dolores Lagos
 Tamara Mazarrasa as Zyan Torres
 Harold Torres as Chris López
 Mariana Burelli as Daniela Hurtado
 Jeimy Osorio as Amanda
 Hernán Del Riego as Bruno Almada
 Mitzi Mabel Cadena as Citlali López "La Mosca"
 Lourdes Ruiz "La Reina del Albur" as Meche
 Diego Cadavid as Jaime Bray González
 Manuel Balbi as Jorge Antonio
 Luis Romano as Reportero
 Carlos Andrés Ramírez as Beto
 Lourdes Reyes as Sofía
 Juan Pablo Medina as General Rául Mejía
 Maxi Iglesias as Ovni
 Marina de Tavira as Patricia Lieberman
 Claudette Maillé as Ofelia Pereda
 Otto Sirgo as Tomás Urquiza

Episodes

Season 1 (2017)

Season 2 (2018)

References

External links
 
 

2017 Mexican television series debuts
2018 Mexican television series endings
Mexican drama television series
Political drama television series
Spanish-language Netflix original programming
Television shows set in Mexico City
Television shows set in San Diego